Operation UNIFIER is the Canadian Armed Forces mission to bolster the capabilities of the Security Forces of Ukraine through the provision of critical military training. It was stood up in response to requests from the Government of Ukraine in light of fomentation by separatist sentiments in the Donetsk and Luhansk and Crimean regions of Ukraine after the 2014 Ukrainian revolution and the 2014 pro-Russian unrest in Ukraine. Up until the 2022 Russian invasion of Ukraine, the training mission took place in Ukraine through a Multinational Joint Commission which included Canada, Denmark, Lithuania, Poland, Slovakia, Sweden, Ukraine, the United Kingdom, and the United States. Since August 2022, the Canadian military has been working alongside the Ministry of Defence in England to deliver training to Ukrainian recruits under Operation Interflex.

History 
In the past, this operation was part of the Multinational Joint Commission, a larger body composed of the U.S., UK, Canada, Sweden, Poland, Lithuania and Denmark, aimed at reforming Ukraine's military. The first Canadian troops to participate in the operation came from the 1st Battalion of the Royal Canadian Regiment. The Canadian contribution of training is provided by about 200 Canadian soldiers, rotating every six months, increased to 260 in January 2022. As of November 2018 there had been 230 course sessions and more than 10,000 Ukrainian soldiers trained under Operation UNIFIER. After 2018, a small Swedish contingent operated within the framework. In December 2021, three Swedish officers were in Ukraine within the framework of Operation UNIFIER.

Timeline
Canada made its first airmail delivery of non-lethal military equipment to Ukraine on November 28, 2014. This equipment mainly included cold protective clothing and was delivered to Boryspil International Airport by the Royal Canadian Air Force (RCAF).

On January 10, 2015, the first shipment of non-lethal military equipment to Ukraine by sea arrived at the port of Odessa.

On April 14, 2015, Canada announced the deployment of a CAF task force, known as Joint Task Force Ukraine or Operation UNIFIER, with nearly 200 Canadian Armed Forces stationed in Ukraine until March 31, 2017. The military training mission officially began on 14 September 2015 at the International Center for Security and Peacekeeping in Starychi and the Ukrainian Ministry of Defense Demining Center in Kamianets-Podilskyi. Newly-promoted Minister of National Defence Jason Kenney announced Canadian military personnel would instruct Ukrainian forces as part of a $700 million gift he called Operation UNIFIER.

On December 8, 2015, the Minister of National Defence of Canada, Harjit Sajjan, announced that his country had signed an agreement with Ukraine for joint military training and for strengthening its military capabilities.

On March 6, 2017, the Government of Canada announced the extension of Operation UNIFIER until the end of March 2019.

On March 18, 2019, the Government of Canada announced the extension of Operation UNIFIER until the end of March 2022.

On January 26, 2022, the Government of Canada announced the extension of Operation UNIFIER until the end of March 2025, and increased the complement of 200 by another 60.

On February 13 the CAF announced that the operation would be temporarily suspended due to the 2021–2022 Russo-Ukrainian crisis, with most of the units involved being sent to Poland. Canada has assured Ukraine that the withdrawal is only temporary. The Swedish contingent was also withdrawn at this time.

On February 24, 2022, Russia invaded Ukraine in a major escalation of the Russo-Ukrainian War, which began in 2014.

The CAF personnel who were deployed on Op UNIFIER returned to Canada on March 18, 2022.

On April 20, 2022, Russia announced retaliatory sanctions against a number of senior Canadian military officials as well soldiers who commanded Operation UNIFIER in Ukraine since 2015 prohibiting them from entering Russia.

In August 2022, CAF personnel deployed to the UK to resume the training of Ukrainian recruits, with the expectation to assist with the training of approximately 10,000 Security Force soldiers.

Mission
According to lobbyists from the NATO Association of Canada, Operation UNIFIER's broader mission includes:
 Helping the development of the region
 Maintaining security
 Maintaining democracy
 Providing humanitarian aid
 Promoting economic stability and growth

Ukrainian diaspora response
Members of the Ukrainian diaspora in Canada positively welcomed the Canadian government's contribution to reform the Ukrainian military. A number of community appreciation events were held in Toronto, Edmonton and Winnipeg for CAF members who have served in Operation UNIFIER. On July 1, 2018, the Band of the Ceremonial Guard performed during its daily guard mounting ceremony on Parliament Hill, a Ukrainian military march known as "" in front of members of the Ukrainian diaspora during the ceremony, as a response to the operation.

See also
List of Canadian military operations

References

2014 in Ukraine
Canada–Ukraine relations
Sweden–Ukraine relations
Canada–Sweden relations
War in Donbas
Unifier
Unifier